Deoptilia heptadeta is a moth of the family Gracillariidae. It is known from Japan (the Ryukyu Islands, Kyūshū, Shikoku, Honshū, Tusima, the Amami Islands) and Taiwan.

The wingspan is 6.3–8.3 mm.

The larvae feed on Mallotus japonicus. They mine the leaves of their host plant. The mine usually occurs upon the upper surface of the leaf; at first it is an entirely epidermal and linear gallery, whitish with a glassy luster and irregularly curved, sometimes occurring along the leaf-veins. Soon after, it is broadened into a moderate blotch, sometimes elongated along a leaf-vein or situated on a space between two veins. It is whitish and blister-like. In the later stages the larva continues feeding on the leaf-tissue within the blotchy mine. Finally, it leaves only upper and lower epidermal layers of the leaf. Grains of the frass are scattered in the mine cavity, usually along the margin. When fully grown, the larva changes body colour into crimson-red and leaves the mine for a pupating site through a semicircular slit. The cocoon is often found on the leaf-surface. It is boat-shaped, with a few minute bubbles on the surface.

References

Acrocercopinae
Moths of Japan
Moths described in 1936